Derek Kolstad (born April 4, 1974) is an American screenwriter and film producer. He is the creator of the John Wick franchise, which began in 2014 with the film of the same name. He continued to write for the sequels of the franchise and is mainly known as a screenwriter of action films and shows.

Biography 
Originally from Madison, Wisconsin, Kolstad attended Edgewood High School of the Sacred Heart and later studied business administration at Taylor University in Indiana. He moved to California at age 24 to pursue screenwriting. He says he started writing films when he was a teenager, but he struggled to find success in Hollywood at first.

Career
The first script he sold was called Acolyte, which was purchased by Voltage Pictures in June 2012. After that, he got some writing and re-writing work, including work on One in the Chamber, starring Dolph Lundgren and Cuba Gooding Jr. He then wrote another Dolph Lundgren film titled  The Package.

By the end of 2012, Kolstad sold his other script, titled Scorn, to Thunder Road Pictures, and in April 2013, Keanu Reeves agreed to star in the film. It was Reeves who suggested the name of the film be changed to John Wick after the title character, who was named after Kolstad's maternal grandfather. The film went on to become a major box office and critical success. It has been followed by two sequels, John Wick: Chapter 2 in 2017 and John Wick: Chapter 3 – Parabellum in 2019. In addition to the films, Kolstad also wrote the video game John Wick: Chronicles and was involved with the creation of the John Wick comic book series. However for the upcoming 4th and fifth films, he was not asked by the studio to return to the franchise. 

In 2017, it was reported that Kolstad will write a live-action television adaptation of the Hitman franchise as well as an action-thriller titled The Steward.

In 2019, it was reported that Kolstad will write and produce a live-action film adaptation of the Just Cause franchise.

In 2020, Netflix announced that Kolstad will be an executive producer and writer on the upcoming "Splinter Cell" anime series.

In 2021, Kolstad was hired to write the screenplay for a live-action adaptation of Hellsing for Amazon Prime Video.

Personal life
Kolstad lives in Pasadena, California with his wife Sonja and twin children.

Filmography 
Film writer

Also credited as "Characters created" in the John Wick franchise.

Television

References

External links 
 

1974 births
Living people
American people of Swedish descent
Writers from Pasadena, California
Writers from Madison, Wisconsin
Taylor University alumni